Zboiska may refer to the following villages in Poland:
Zboiska, Krosno County in Subcarpathian Voivodeship (south-east Poland)
  - a Polish name of a former village, currently a district in Lviv, Ukraine.
Zboiska, Masovian Voivodeship (east-central Poland)
Zboiska, Sanok County in Subcarpathian Voivodeship (south-east Poland)

See also